Quezalguaque is a municipality in the León Department of Nicaragua.

International relations

Twin towns – Sister cities
Quezalguaque is a sister city with:

References

Municipalities of the León Department